Hyperstrotia nana, the white-lined graylet, is a species of moth in the family Erebidae. It is found in North America.

The MONA or Hodges number for Hyperstrotia nana is 9035.

References

Further reading

 
 
 

Boletobiinae
Articles created by Qbugbot
Moths described in 1818